Hedayetullah Al Mamoon is a retired Senior Secretary at the Ministry of Finance of Bangladesh and the chairperson of Janata Bank.

Career 
Mamun joined the Bangladesh Civil Service in 1982.

In November 2008, Mamun was appointed the Additional Secretary to the Ministry of Law, Justice and Parliamentary affairs. Bangladesh Judicial Service Association expressed concern over the appointment of Mamun as he was an admin cadre.

In 2009, Mamun served as the Secretary at the Ministry of Culture. He then became the secretary at the Ministry of Civil Aviation and Tourism in October 2009.

Mamun served as the Secretary at the Ministry of Information.

From 2014 to 28 February  2017, Mamun served as the Secretary of the Ministry of Commerce. On 25 February 2018, Mamun was appointed the Chairman of Janata Bank, a state owned bank, by the Bank and Financial Institutions Division of the Ministry of Finance.

Mamun held a solo lecture on 28 June 2019 on the works of Ranjit Kumar Biswas, writer and former bureaucrat, at the Bangla Academy.

In 2020, Mamun became the member secretary of the newly launched Association of Former Secretaries. He is member of the governing body of Bangladesh Institute of Governance and Management. In September 2022, the government broke the trustee board of Manarat International University and created a new board which included him.

Personal life 
Mamun's brother, Obayed Ullah Al Masud, is the managing director of Rupali Bank and previously headed Sonali Bank, both state owned banks.

References 

Living people
Year of birth missing (living people)
Bangladeshi civil servants
Bangladeshi bankers